Shorrock is a surname. Notable people with the surname include:

 Arthur Gostick Shorrock, British Baptist missionary
 Christopher Shorrock, joint inventor of the Shorrock supercharger
 Eccles Shorrock, British cotton mill owner
 Glenn Shorrock, Australian singer, a founder of Little River Band
 Tim Shorrock, American writer and commentator on foreign policy, national security and politics
 Will Shorrock, English footballer

See also
 Anthony Shorrocks, British economist
 Ernest Shorrocks, British cricket player
 Jake Shorrocks, English rugby league footballer

English-language surnames